Île Bigras is the largest of the four islands that make up the Îles-Laval archipelago in the Rivière des Prairies in Quebec. They all are part of the city of Laval since 1965.

The  Île Bigras was named in 1817 as Île Amesse, after the name of its owner, Louis Amesse (other more recent maps have also shown the names Île Boiret and Île Boisvert). The island was bought in 1890 by Émilien Bigras, who gave it his name. He was also the owner of the three other islands of the archipelago: Île Pariseau, Île Verte and Île Ronde.

Thanks to the Deux-Montagnes commuter train line and its station, the island is less than 30 minutes from Downtown Montreal and Central Station. It is also less than a quarter-hour from the seasonal reaction ferry that connects Île Bizard with Laval-sur-le-Lac. A park and ride at the station can accommodate several cars.

External links 
 Map of Île Bigras (Laval)

See also 
 Hochelaga Archipelago
 Île-Bigras station

Bigras
Landforms of Laval, Quebec